The Irvine family of Southern California is a prominent Californian family of real estate developers. Through the Irvine Company, the family played an important role in the development of Orange County. The city of Irvine and the University of California, Irvine take their name from the family.

James Irvine I
James Irvine (1827–1886) was born in County Down, Ireland on December 27, 1827, the second to the youngest of nine children. When Ireland's potato crop failed in 1845, James Irvine and his younger brother William were among those who left for the United States. The family name is Scottish, meaning that James would have been an Ulster Scot, or Scots-Irish. Irvine worked for two years in New York City. In 1848 Irvine went to join the California Gold Rush as a merchant and miner. In 1854, he purchased an interest in a San Francisco commission house on Front Street, operated by a relative, John Lyons. The business was renamed "Irvine & Co., wholesale produce and grocery merchants". He began investing his profits in income-producing San Francisco real estate and soon became a wealthy man. Irvine also became a silent partner in the sheep-raising venture Flint, Bixby & Company of brothers Thomas and Benjamin Flint, and their cousin Llewellyn Bixby. The purchase of the  Rancho San Joaquin in 1864 and the  Rancho Lomas de Santiago in 1866 marked the beginning of their operations in Southern California. In 1867, Irvine married Henrietta Maria (Nettie) Rice, the daughter of prominent Cleveland, Ohio, educator, writer, poet and State Senator Harvey Rice, who was a direct descendant of early Massachusetts Bay Colony settler Edmund Rice. Nettie died in 1874, and Irvine married Margaret Byrne in 1880. He died March 15, 1886, and is buried in Colma, California.

James Irvine II
James Harvey Irvine, Sr. (1867–1947), son of James Irvine I and Henrietta Maria (Nettie) Rice, was born October 16, 1867, in San Francisco. He was the grandson of Harvey Rice. James II's mother died when he was seven years old, and his father died when he was about eighteen. Between the time of James Irvine I's death in 1886 and James Irvine II's inheritance of the Southern California real estate holdings upon his twenty-fifth birthday in 1892, the properties were supervised by James Irvine I's brother, George Irvine. James II bought out Flint and the other partners, and formed the Irvine Company. He married Frances Anita Plum in 1892, and they had three children, James Harvey "Jase" Irvine Jr. (1894–1935), Katharine Helena Irvine (1894–1920) and Myford Plum Irvine (1898–1959). In 1931, James II married Mrs. Kathryn Brown White, who died in 1950. James II lived in San Francisco until the 1906 San Francisco earthquake, when he relocated to the Irvine Ranch. He was a member of the Bohemian Club, and kept a residence in San Francisco, at 2421 Pierce Street. He established the James Irvine Foundation in 1937, an entity dedicated to the "general well-being of the citizens and residents of the state of California." James II owned nearly a third of the land in present-day Orange County. The city of Irvine (formerly Myford) is named after him. He died of Bright's disease in 1947.

James Irvine III
James Harvey Irvine, Jr. (1894–1935) was groomed since a young man to take over the Ranch. He married Madeline Agassiz in 1914, but they were divorced in 1928. He married Athalie Richardson (1903–1993) in 1929, and they had one daughter, Athalie Anita "Joan" Irvine (1933–2019 ). When James Irvine III died of tuberculosis in 1935, James II set up The James Irvine Foundation, a charitable organization to hold controlling stock in the Irvine Company. When James II died in 1947, Myford Plum Irvine (1898–1959), James II's only surviving child, took over the presidency of the Irvine Company.

See also
Clan Irvine

References

External links
Irvine Historical Society (Internet Archive)
Irvine Ranch Water District History
Irvine Ranch Water District History (Internet Archive)
The James Irvine Foundation
History of Irvine, CA
History of Irvine, CA (Internet Archive)

Families from California
Land owners from California
Ranchers from California
American families of Scotch-Irish ancestry
History of Orange County, California